Maria Helena Andrés (born August 2, 1922) is a Brazilian artist. She studied in the 1940s at the Guignard University of Art of Minas Gerais.

Andrés' work is included in the collections of the Museum of Fine Arts, Houston and the Seattle Art Museum.

Andrés turned 100 on August 2, 2022.

References

1922 births
20th-century Brazilian artists
Living people
21st-century Brazilian artists
Brazilian centenarians
Women centenarians